List of Egyptian films from 1907 to  1919:

References

External links
 The Early Years of Documentaries and Short Films in Egypt at Bibliotheca Alexandria's Alex Cinema

1910s